Mario Marín may refer to:
Mario Marín (politician) (born 1954), Mexican politician
Mario Marín (footballer) (born 1991), Spanish footballer